Tamerlan, derived from the name of Muslim conqueror Tamerlane, is a given name. Notable people with the name include:

Tamerlan Sikoyev (born 1976), Russian footballer
Tamerlan Tagziev (born 1981), Canadian wrestler
Tamerlan Thorell (1830–1901), Swedish arachnologist
Tamerlan Tmenov (born 1977), Russian judoka
Tamerlan Tsarnaev (1986–2013), Russian terrorist
Tamerlan Varziyev (born 1978), Russian footballer